Trimerodytes percarinatus, commonly known as the eastern water snake, olive keelback, olive annulate keelback or Chinese keelback water snake, is a species of snake in the subfamily Natricinae.

Taxonomy
The type locality for T. percarinatus is Guadun (formerly spelled as Kuatun), Wuyishan City (former Chongan County) in NW Fujian, China.

Subspecies
The subspecies Trimerodytes percarinatus suriki is endemic to Taiwan where it occurs in the whole country.

Description
T. percarinatus is a defensive snake that bites readily when caught, but it is not venomous. An adult female usually lays 4 to 13 eggs, but may lay as many as 25 eggs.

Distribution and habitat
T. percarinatus is found in NE India (Changlang District, Arunachal Pradesh), Myanmar (= Burma), Thailand, Laos, Vietnam, S China (Hainan, Zhejiang, Jiangxi, Fujian, Guangdong, Guangxi, Guizhou, Sichuan, Hubei), Hong Kong, and Taiwan. It is an aquatic species associated with hilly areas.

Diet
T. percarinatus preys on shrimps, frogs (including tadpoles), and fish.

References

Further reading
Smith MA (1943). The Fauna of British India, Ceylon and Burma, Including the Whole of the Indo-Chinese Sub-region. Reptilia and Amphibia. Vol. III.—Serpentes. London: Secretary of State for India. (Taylor and Francis, printers). xii + 583 pp. (Natrix percarinata, p. 299).

Trimerodytes
Snakes of Asia
Snakes of China
Reptiles of Hong Kong
Reptiles of India
Reptiles of Laos
Reptiles of Myanmar
Reptiles of Taiwan
Reptiles of Thailand
Snakes of Vietnam
Reptiles described in 1899
Taxa named by George Albert Boulenger